Look in Any Window is a 1961 American drama film starring Paul Anka, Gigi Perreau, and, in his film debut, Jack Cassidy. The film was directed by William Alland and released by Allied Artists.

Plot
A teenager is brought up by uncaring, dysfunctional parents.  The teen, Craig Fowler, develops a habit of peeping on his neighbors in a modern suburban area while donning a frightening mask.

Cast

 Paul Anka as Craig Fowler
 Ruth Roman as Jackie Fowler
 Alex Nicol as Jay Fowler
 Gigi Perreau as Eileen Lowell
 Carole Mathews as Betty Lowell
 Jack Cassidy as Gareth Lowell

References

External links
 
 
 
 

1961 films
1961 drama films
1960s teen films
Allied Artists films
American black-and-white films
American teen drama films
1960s English-language films
Films about dysfunctional families
Films set in California
1961 directorial debut films
1960s American films